Crash Team Racing Nitro-Fueled is a 2019 kart racing game developed by Beenox and published by Activision. The game is a remastered version of Crash Team Racing, which was originally developed by Naughty Dog for the PlayStation in 1999, and focuses on players using one of several characters from the Crash Bandicoot series to tackle races, each of which includes power-ups to help with combatting opponents. The game includes additional content from Crash Nitro Kart  and Crash Tag Team Racing, alongside adjustments to the original gameplay, including kart customization, two adventure mode variations, and an in-game shop.

Nitro–Fueled was released worldwide for Nintendo Switch, PlayStation 4, and Xbox One on June 21, 2019. It received generally positive reviews from critics, who praised the gameplay, controls, graphics, abundance of content, and faithfulness to the original game, though its high difficulty curve and post-release addition of microtransactions were criticized. The game also won several awards.

Gameplay

Like the original Crash Team Racing, Nitro-Fueled is a racing game featuring characters from the Crash Bandicoot series. Players must avoid obstacles and navigate the various tracks to reach the finish line, performing boosts via power sliding and jumping to gain speed, and using power-ups scattered across the track to give themselves a boost or hinder their opponents. The game supports local quick races and grand prix circuits, multiple battle modes, and online multiplayer, as well as featuring a full adventure mode with new areas, characters and boss battles being unlocked as the player progresses.

Nitro-Fueled includes all of the content from Crash Team Racing, along with several new features not present in the original game, including online multiplayer and the ability to choose different karts, which can be customized by the player. The adventure mode has also been tweaked: in addition to new cinematic cutscenes being added, players can choose between "Classic" and "Nitro-Fueled" adventure modes, the latter of which allows players to change their character and kart between races, as well as choose between three difficulty levels. An additional "Ring Rally" mode was added as part of a post-launch update, in which players must pass through rings on a track to gain time extensions and prevent a timer from expiring. Nitro-Fueled also adds a substantial amount of content from Crash Nitro Kart, including all of its characters, race tracks, battle arenas, karts and battle modes. Additional characters, karts and character skins from Crash Tag Team Racing are included as well. This and other new content is accessible via the Pit Stop, an in-game shop that allows players to purchase unlockables using Wumpa Coins earned through gameplay or obtained via microtransactions.

Nitro-Fueled featured limited-time Grand Prix events that took place monthly following the game's launch. Each event was accompanied by a free update that added a new race track to the game. Players could compete in special challenges on these new tracks during the event period to earn Nitro Points; by acquiring a certain number of points, they would be able to unlock new characters, karts, and customization items. If players were unable to obtain enough points before the event concluded, the content was made available for purchase in the Pit Stop three months after the event's conclusion. A total of eight Grand Prix events were held between July 2019 and March 2020, though one final wave of new content was released after their conclusion.

Characters

Nitro-Fueled features 56 playable characters, including every racer from the prior Crash racing games. This includes characters who previously only appeared as boss opponents and as console-exclusive characters like Spyro. Only the eight base characters from the original Crash Team Racing are initially available to players. The other Crash Team Racing characters can be unlocked by progressing through the game's adventure mode and completing challenges, while all other characters are unlocked via purchase from the Pit Stop.

The game featured 26 playable characters at launch, consisting of all the racers featured in Team Racing and Nitro Kart. Several additional characters have been added as part of free post-launch game updates, and can be unlocked through progression in Grand Prix events or via the Pit Stop. This includes all the playable racers from Tag Team Racing and Nitro Kart 2, along with several characters making their first playable appearance in a Crash racing game. New racers include Tawna, N. Brio, Koala Kong and the Lab Assistant from the original Crash Bandicoot; Komodo Moe from Cortex Strikes Back; Baby T. and the Iron Checkpoint Crate from Warped; Ami, Isabella, Megumi and Liz, who appeared as non-playable characters in Team Racing; two versions of Rilla Roo from Bash; Megamix from The Huge Adventure; Chick and Stew, who appeared as non-playable characters in Tag Team Racing; baby versions of Crash, Coco, Cortex and N. Tropy; guest characters Hunter and Gnasty Gnorc from the Spyro series; and two original characters, King Chicken and Hasty.

Development
After the release of Crash Bandicoot N. Sane Trilogy, a collection of remasters of the first three Crash Bandicoot titles, it was speculated that Crash Team Racing would be remastered. In an interview, Vicarious Visions producer Kara Massie did not rule out the possibility of a remaster of Crash Team Racing for the PlayStation 4. She also acknowledged that she was repeatedly asked about it by fans.

The game was revealed at The Game Awards on December 6, 2018, and was announced to be released on June 21, 2019 for Nintendo Switch, PlayStation 4, and Xbox One. Development was handled by Activision subsidiary Beenox. Much like N. Sane Trilogy, the game was recreated from the ground up with new assets, online play, and added new content including all characters, tracks, battle arenas, kart customizations and battle modes from Crash Nitro Kart, which was developed by Vicarious Visions, who also developed the N. Sane Trilogy. Several karts, character skins, and later characters were also added from Crash Tag Team Racing, which was originally developed by Radical Entertainment. The game features an option to choose between the original and remastered soundtracks.

Release
Players who pre-ordered the game received a set of "Electron" character skins for Crash, Coco and Cortex. A premium "Nitros Oxide Edition" of Nitro-Fueled was announced alongside the game in December 2018, while its contents were detailed in April 2019. The Nitros Oxide Edition provides immediate access to the unlockable Hovercraft kart and the characters Nitros Oxide, Crunch, Zem and Zam, along with the pre-order skins and additional character skins and kart customization options not available in the base game.

The PlayStation 4 version of Nitro-Fueled includes exclusive skins for Crash, Coco and Cortex based on their polygonal appearances in the original Crash Team Racing, along with additional low-poly karts and a retro-themed bonus track, Retro Stadium. Players who pre-ordered this version also received a set of PlayStation-themed stickers for kart customization.

On July 30, 2019, Activision announced the addition of in-game purchases to the game, allowing players to purchase the in-game Wumpa Coin currency used to unlock new characters, karts and other customization items. The feature was implemented on August 8.

In August 2019, as part of a co-promotion with Mondelez International, codes for candy-themed kart customization items were included with specially-marked packages of Sour Patch Kids and Trident Vibes. An additional vehicle, the "Firehawk", was released as paid downloadable content in October 2019 to support the Call of Duty Endowment. A special Xfinity branded kart was released as a limited-time promotional item for Xfinity customers in February 2020.

Reception 

Crash Team Racing Nitro-Fueled received "generally favorable" reviews, according to review aggregator Metacritic. Critics praised the graphics, tight controls, massive amount of content and faithfulness to the original racing games, though it was criticized for its high difficulty curve, lack of difficulty options, very long loading times, and issues with online play on the PlayStation 4 version of the game. The inclusion of microtransactions which were added a month after the game's release was also criticized, particularly as early interviews stated no such feature would be present in the game. Another common criticism within the player base is the lack of a PC port for the game, despite ports being made for Crash Bandicoot N. Sane Triology and Crash Bandicoot 4: It's About Time.

During its release week, Nitro-Fueled opened at number one in the UK for the week ending June 30, 2019.

Awards
The game won the award for "Best Racing Game" at the 2019 Game Critics Awards, and for "Best Sports/Racing Game" at The Game Awards 2019. IGN named Nitro-Fueled the best racing game of 2019. The game was also nominated for "Racing Game of the Year" at the 23rd Annual D.I.C.E. Awards, and for "Game, Classic Revival" at the NAVGTR Awards.

Notes

References

External links
 
 
 

2019 video games
Activision games
Beenox games
Crash Bandicoot racing games
Kart racing video games
Multiplayer and single-player video games
Nintendo Switch games
PlayStation 4 games
PlayStation 4 Pro enhanced games
Vehicular combat games
Video games scored by Josh Mancell
Video game remasters
Video games featuring female protagonists
Video games developed in Canada
Xbox One games
Xbox One X enhanced games
Crossover racing games
Video games using Havok
The Game Awards winners